If You Must may refer to:

If You Must (Nirvana song)
If You Must (Del the Funky Homosapien song)
If You Must (album), a 1994 album by Precious Death